The 2023 Stock Car Pro Series will be the 45th season of Stock Car Brasil. The season will start at the Autódromo Internacional Ayrton Senna on April 2nd. The final race of the season will be held at Interlagos on December 17.

Teams and drivers

Notes

Schedule 
The schedule for the 2023 season was released on 3 December 2022.

Broadcasting

See also 

 2023 Stock Series
 2023 Turismo Nacional BR
 2023 F4 Brazilian Championship

References

External links 
  

Stock Car Brasil seasons
Stock Car Pro Series
Stock Car Pro Series